Panamomops is a genus of dwarf spiders that was first described by Eugène Louis Simon in 1884.

Species
 it contains thirteen species:
Panamomops affinis Miller & Kratochvíl, 1939 – Switzerland, Germany, Austria, Czech Rep., Slovakia
Panamomops depilis Eskov & Marusik, 1994 – Russia (Central Asia, South Siberia), Kazakhstan
Panamomops dybowskii (O. Pickard-Cambridge, 1873) – Russia (Europe to Central Siberia)
Panamomops fagei Miller & Kratochvíl, 1939 – Central Europe, Italy
Panamomops fedotovi (Charitonov, 1937) – Ukraine, Georgia, Armenia
Panamomops inconspicuus (Miller & Valesova, 1964) – Italy, Central and Eastern Europe
Panamomops latifrons Miller, 1959 – Czech Rep., Slovakia, Austria, Balkans
Panamomops mengei Simon, 1926 – Europe, Russia (Europe to West Siberia and Central Asia), Kazakhstan
Panamomops mutilus (Denis, 1962) – Spain, France
Panamomops palmgreni Thaler, 1973 – Germany, Switzerland, Austria, Slovakia
Panamomops pamiricus Tanasevitch, 1989 – Kyrgyzstan
Panamomops sulcifrons (Wider, 1834) (type) – Europe
Panamomops tauricornis (Simon, 1881) – Alps (Germany, Switzerland, Austria, Italy), Finland, Russia (Europe to Far East)

See also
 List of Linyphiidae species (I–P)

References

Araneomorphae genera
Linyphiidae
Spiders of Asia